Jennifer Nielsen may refer to:

 Jennifer Lalor Nielsen, American soccer player
 Jennifer A. Nielsen, American author